Capricorns (sometimes stylized as CAPRICORNS) is an instrumental progressive metal band from London, mixing various elements of doom metal, sludge metal and math rock guitars. The band's lineup consisted of guitarist Nathan Dylan Bennett, guitarist Chris Cates , bassist Dean Berry and drummer Nathan Perrier. They have been inspired by Italian horror and they feature ex-members of Orange Goblin and Iron Monkey.

History
Capricorns formed in 2003. In 2005 they recorded their debut album "Ruder Forms Survive" following the release of their self-titled three-track EP (2004). 2005 was also the year they toured in the UK with Electric Wizard. In 2008 they released their second full album "River, Bear Your Bones" on Rise Above Records based at the time in multiple geographical locations and in the same year they disbanded.

Band members
 Chris Cates (guitar)
 Nathan Dylan Bennett (guitar)
 Kevin Williams (guitar)
 Dean Berry (bass)
 Nathan Perrier (drums)
 Christopher Turner (drums)
 Javier Villegas (bass)
 Chris West (bass)
 Anthony Dearlove (bass)

Discography

Studio albums

Other works

References

External links
 Capricorns' Myspace
 Rise Above Records

Sludge metal musical groups
Musical quartets
Musical groups established in 2003